Chadwick Everett Brown (born July 12, 1970) is a former American football linebacker of the National Football League (NFL). He was drafted by the Pittsburgh Steelers in the second round of the 1993 NFL Draft. He played college football at Colorado.

Early life and college
Born in Altadena, California,  Brown graduated from John Muir High School in 1988. At the University of Colorado, Brown was a four-year starter on the Colorado Buffaloes football team.

Professional career
Brown was initially drafted by the Pittsburgh Steelers in the second round, and became an important part of the "Blitzburgh" defense.  Initially, he played at the inside linebacker position in the 3-4 with Levon Kirkland.   He started at right inside linebacker in Super Bowl XXX for the Steelers, a loss to the Dallas Cowboys. He then moved to the outside when Greg Lloyd was lost for the 1996 season due to injury, where he went to his first Pro Bowl after that season. His success would continue with the Seattle Seahawks, going to two more Pro Bowls in the 1990s.

He signed with the Patriots as a replacement for injured inside linebacker Tedy Bruschi in 2005.  After several games of what was thought to be subpar performance at his new position, Brown spent most of the rest of the season only on special teams. In September of 2006, after re-signing with the Patriots, Brown was released by the Patriots as one of their final cuts. He then signed with the Steelers and finished the season on their injured reserve.

On July 19, 2007, he re-joined the Patriots but was released on September 1, 2007. On September 11, 2007, the Pats re-signed him, and released him again on October 10, 2007. Brown was re-signed by the Patriots yet again on November 27, 2007, after linebacker Rosevelt Colvin was placed on season-ending injured reserve. He was released on December 27, 2007, before the Patriots became AFC champions for the season in Super Bowl XLII.

Broadcasting career
Since retiring as a player, Brown has worked as a color analyst and sideline reporter for college and NFL football on a variety of networks, including Compass Media Networks, the Pac-12 Network, ESPN3, Westwood One, and NBCSN.

Brown is a sports-talk radio host in Denver on 104.3 The Fan.

Personal life
Since his NFL career began, Brown has also operated a business named Pro Exotics that sells non-venomous snakes.

References

External links
New England Patriots bio

1970 births
Living people
People from Altadena, California
American football linebackers
Colorado Buffaloes football players
Pittsburgh Steelers players
American Conference Pro Bowl players
Seattle Seahawks players
Sportspeople from Los Angeles County, California
New England Patriots players
Players of American football from California
College football announcers
National Football League announcers
Ed Block Courage Award recipients